"One Love" is the third single released by French DJ and record producer David Guetta from his fourth studio album of the same name. The single was released in the United Kingdom on 23 November 2009. It features guest vocals by Grammy Award-winning British singer Estelle. It was added to the BBC Radio 1 playlist the week of 28 October 2009.

Critical reception
David Balls of Digital Spy gave the song a positive review stating:  David Guetta must feel like le chat who got la crème. During 2009, the French knob-twiddler has notched up a pair of No. 1s ('When Love Takes Over', 'Sexy Bitch'), produced The Black Eyed Peas' record-breaking smash 'I Gotta Feeling', and teamed up with a glittering array of A-list stars for his One Love album. What's more, he hasn't run of out puff just yet. This time around, he's recruited our very own Estelle to help him pack out the dancefloor. His production's as clubby and anthemic as ever, but it's La Swaray who brings that extra bit of magic to 'One Love'. As with her 2005 Faithless collaboration 'Why Go?', her vocals ooze a melancholy optimism that dovetails perfectly with the heady beats. The result not only extends Guetta's winning streak, but also whets the appetite for Estelle LP#3 – in prog now.

Music video
The official video for the song was directed by X. It was filmed on 17 October 2009 in Los Angeles and released on 12 November 2009 on David Guetta's official YouTube channel. The video features Guetta and Estelle getting into a black 1967 Camaro with Guetta playing the upcoming song on his Nokia phone and features them driving though the city. As they go they find depressed people and make them happy, causing them to dance as they send their love through the shape of a heart created by their hands.

Track listing
UK CD single
"One Love" (radio edit)  – 4:00
"One Love" (extended mix)  – 6:46

European CD single
"One Love" (extended mix)  – 6:46
"One Love" (Chuckie & Fatman Scoop Remix)  – 8:00
"One Love" (Avicii Remix)  – 7:45
"One Love" (Calvin Harris Remix)  – 6:00
"One Love" (Arias Remix)  – 7:08
"One Love" (Chocolate Puma Remix)  – 4:48
"One Love" (radio edit)  – 4:00

Charts

Weekly charts

Year-end charts

See also 
List of number-one dance singles of 2010 (U.S.)

References

2009 singles
David Guetta songs
Estelle (musician) songs
Music videos directed by Director X
Songs written by David Guetta
Songs written by Sandy Vee
Songs written by Estelle (musician)
Songs written by Jean-Claude Sindres
2009 songs
EMI Records singles
Virgin Records singles
Song recordings produced by David Guetta